Tamara Cassimon (born 23 October 1975) is a Belgian football manager and former player.

Biography 
Cassimon is for many years active in women's football. She played in the highest division at Brussels Dames 71 and DVK Haacht. But early in her career she had to give up playing due several serious injuries.

In 2003 she decided to become a manager at SK Oetingen in the 1e Provincial Division in Vlaams Brabant. In her first year she and the team made the promotion to the 3rd Division. In December 2005 she became manager of Oud-Heverlee Leuven, she became the youngest manager in the highest division.

From December 2007 until 2011 she was manager of Sinaai Girls. In the last 3 seasons she managed Sinaai she won 3 times in a row the Belgian Cup. In 2009 against Standard Fémina de Liège, in 2010 against RSC Anderlecht and in 2011 against WD Lierse SK.

She left 2011 Sinaai to become Assistant coach of Ives Serneels with the Belgian Red Flames and de young Flames U17. In addition she's active for the Women's Football Department of the RBFA.

May 2017 she announced that after the 2017 European Championship in The Netherlands she would leave the Red Flames to manage Fémina White Star Woluwe because she misses to perform on a weekly basis.

Awards

As manager 
 Belgian Cup: 2009, 2010, 2011

References

External links 
  Profile RBFA
  Profile Voetbalkrant.be

Belgian women's footballers
Belgium women's international footballers
Women's national association football team managers
Women's association football forwards
1975 births
Living people
Belgian football managers